Luis Felipe Céspedes Cifuentes (born 17 October 1970) is a Chilean politician and economist who served as minister of Economy.

He is the current counselor of the Central Bank of Chile.

References

External links
 Profile at FEN

1970 births
Living people
Pontifical Catholic University of Chile alumni
New York University alumni
21st-century Chilean politicians
Christian Democratic Party (Chile) politicians
Government ministers of Chile